The Peach Springs Unified School District is the school district in Peach Springs, Arizona. It consists of one elementary and middle school; there is no high school in the district, though Peach Springs once did have its own public high school, Music Mountain Junior/Senior High School. Peach Springs Unified currently pays other school districts to provide high school education. Kingman Unified School District and Seligman Unified School District accept Peach Springs students.  all of the students are of the Hualapai American Indian people.

See also
 Non-high school district

References

External links

School districts in Mohave County, Arizona
Public K–8 schools in Arizona